Rhytiphora obliqua is a species of beetle in the family Cerambycidae. It was described by Edward Donovan in 1805. It is known from Australia.

References

obliqua
Beetles described in 1805